This is a list of the state libraries ( for each of the Länder of the Federal Republic of Germany. These libraries hold the right for legal deposit for the publications in their respective state.

Landesbibliothek

Staatsbibliothek
The historic National Libraries of the former Kingdoms, now States of Germany (Länder), are called Staatsbibliothek (state libraries). Among the libraries named Staatsbibliothek are:
 the Bavarian State Library (Bayerische Staatsbibliothek or BSB) in Munich, one of the world's largest libraries and the former library of the Kingdom of Bavaria
 the Bamberg State Library (Staatsbibliothek Bamberg), a library in Bamberg, Bavaria
 the Berlin State Library (Staatsbibliothek zu Berlin), the largest academic library in the German language and former library of the Kingdom of Prussia
 the Göttingen State and University Library (Niedersächsische Staats- und Universitätsbibliothek Göttingen) is among other things the Staatsbibliothek of Lower Saxony
 the Saxon State Library (Sächsische Landesbibliothek − Staats- und Universitätsbibliothek Dresden) is among other things the Staatsbibliothek of Saxony and the former Royal Library of the Dukes of Saxony

Stadtbibliothek
Stadtbibliothek ("City Library") refers to a major city library. All major cities in German-speaking countries have these and some also have legal deposit requirements. Large Stadtbibliothek include:
 Berlin City Library (Stadtbibliothek Berlin), with legal deposit for the city of Berlin.
 Cologne Public Library (Stadtbibliothek Koln), is among the biggest and most important public libraries in Germany.
 Stadtbibliothek Braunschweig, in Braunschweig
 Stadtbibliothek Bremen, in Bremen
 Stadtbibliothek Mainz, in Mainz
 Stadtbibliothek Hannover, in Hannover
Wiener Stadtbibliothek, the library in Vienna

See also
 List of libraries in Austria
 List of libraries in Germany
 Liechtensteinische Landesbibliothek

References

Libraries